Deacock Glacier is a glacier close west of Lavett Bluff on the south side of Heard Island in the southern Indian Ocean. Its terminus is between Cape Labuan and Long Beach. To the east of Deacock Glacier is Fiftyone Glacier, whose terminus is located between Lavett Bluff and Lambeth Bluff. To the west of Deacock Glacier is Gotley Glacier, whose terminus is located between Cape Arkona and Cape Labuan.

Discovery and naming
Surveyed by ANARE (Australian National Antarctic Research Expeditions), 1948-63. Named by Antarctic Names Committee of Australia (ANCA) for W. Deacock, a member of ANARE on Heard Island in 1963.

References

Further reading

External links
Click here to see a map of Heard Island and McDonald Islands, including all major topographical features
Australian Antarctic Division
Australian Antarctic Gazetteer
Composite Gazetteer of Antarctica
Australian Antarctic Names and Medals Committee (AANMC)
United States Geological Survey, Geographic Names Information System (GNIS)
Scientific Committee on Antarctic Research (SCAR)

Glaciers of Heard Island and McDonald Islands